The 2008–09 season was the 104th season in the existence of 1. FSV Mainz 05 and the club's second consecutive season in the top flight of German football. In addition to the domestic league, 1. FSV Mainz 05 participated in this season's edition of the DFB-Pokal. The season covered the period from 1 July 2008 to 30 June 2009.

Transfers

In

Out

Competitions

Overall record

2. Bundesliga

League table

Results summary

Results by round

Matches

Source:

DFB-Pokal

Statistics

Goalscorers

References

1. FSV Mainz 05 seasons
1. FSV Mainz 05